Epeli Hauʻofa (7 December 1939 – 11 January 2009) was a Tongan and Fijian writer and anthropologist born of Tongan missionary parents in the Territory of Papua. He lived in Fiji and taught at the University of the South Pacific (USP). He was the founder of the Oceania Centre for Arts at the USP.

Biography
Hauʻofa was born of Tongan missionary parents working in Papua New Guinea. At his death, he was a citizen of Fiji, living in Wainadoi, Fiji. He went to school in Papua New Guinea, Tonga and Fiji (Lelean Memorial School), and attended the University of New England, Armidale, New South Wales; McGill University, Montreal; and the Australian National University, Canberra, where he gained a PhD in social anthropology, published in 1981 with the title Mekeo: Inequality and Ambivalence in a Village Society. He taught as a tutor at the University of Papua New Guinea, and was a research fellow at the University of the South Pacific in Suva, Fiji. From 1978 to 1981 he was Deputy Private Secretary to His Majesty the King of Tonga, serving as the keeper of palace records. During his time in Tonga, Hauʻofa co-produced the literary magazine Faikara with his wife Barbara. In early 1981 he re-joined the University of the South Pacific as the first director of the newly created Rural Development Centre based in Tonga.

He subsequently taught sociology at the University of the South Pacific and, in 1983, he became Head of the Department of Sociology at the University's main campus in Suva. In 1997, Hauʻofa became the founder and director of the Oceania Centre for Arts and Culture at the USP in Suva.

Writing
He was the author of Mekeo: Inequality and Ambivalence in a Village Society; Tales of the Tikongs, which deals (through fiction) with indigenous South Pacific Islander responses to the changes and challenges brought by modernisation and development; Kisses in the Nederends, a novel; and, more recently, We Are the Ocean, a selection of earlier works, including fiction, poetry and essays. Tales of the Tikongs was translated into Danish in 2002 by John Allan Pedersen (as Stillehavsfortællinger)

The BBC History magazine writes that Hauʻofa provided a "reconceptualisation of the Pacific": In his "influential essay Our Sea of Islands", he argued that Pacific Islanders "were connected rather than separated by the sea. Far from being sea-locked peoples marooned on coral or volcanic tips of land, islanders formed an oceanic community based on voyaging."

The essay Our Sea of Islands was published in A New Oceania : Rediscovering our Sea of Islands, co-edited by Hauʻofa, Vijay Naidu and Eric Waddell, published in 1993.

Death
Hauʻofa died at the Suva Private Hospital in Suva at 7 AM on 11 January 2009 at the age of sixty-nine. He was survived by his wife, Barbara, and son, Epeli Si'i. A funeral service was held at the University of the South Pacific campus in Suva on 15 January 2009. He was buried at his residence in Wainadoi, Fiji.

External links
 "Epeli Hau'ofa : Muse, mediator and mentor", obituary by Joni Madraiwiwi, former Vice-President of Fiji, in the Fiji Times, 19 January 2009
 Poutous sur le popotin , French translation of Kisses on the Nederends (Penguin Books, 1987) by Mireille Vignol, éditions Au vent des îles, 2012

References

Tongan writers
Tongan anthropologists
Fijian writers
Fijian anthropologists
People educated at Lelean Memorial School
1939 births
2009 deaths
University of the South Pacific alumni
Academic staff of the University of the South Pacific
Australian National University alumni
University of New England (Australia) alumni
McGill University alumni
Fijian people of Tongan descent
Academic staff of the University of Papua New Guinea
20th-century Fijian writers
20th-century Tongan writers
20th-century anthropologists